See: Intermediate League Baseball
The Intermediate League World Series is a baseball tournament for children aged 11 to 13 years old that began in 2013. It is patterned after the Little League World Series, which was named for the World Series in Major League Baseball. The tournament is held in Livermore, California. 

The intermediate division is the second of four Little League divisions by development. The pitching mound is 50 feet from home plate, and the base paths are 70 feet apart. This allows for a transition between the smaller field dimensions of Little League (46/60), and the standard field dimensions of the advanced leagues (60.5/90).

Tournament format

Unlike the Little League World Series — which has twenty regions (ten in the U.S. and ten international) — the Intermediate League World Series has eleven regions, plus a host team. The regional champions are divided into Pool A (U.S.) and Pool B (International). The teams advance to the semi-finals via a modified double elimination format; the semifinal and final are single elimination. Teams that lose their first two games face off in classification games.

Pool A (U.S.) consists of five regions + the host team
Central
East
Host
Southeast
Southwest
West 

Pool B (International) consists of six regions
Asia–Pacific
Australia
Canada
Europe–Africa
Latin America
Mexico / Puerto Rico

Champions

Championships won by Country/State

See also
List of Little League World Series champions by division

References

External links
 Little League Baseball official website

 
Baseball in California
Sports competitions in California
Sports in Alameda County, California
Annual sporting events in the United States
Recurring sporting events established in 2013
Baseball leagues in California
2013 establishments in California